News Nation Assam (formerly called  NNA) test signal will start in October 2016 and will on air from 1 Jan 2017. It will carries news on issues in fields like politics, crime, corruption, cricket, and Bollywood.

See also

 List of television stations in India

References

External links

Television stations in Guwahati
24-hour television news channels in India
Assamese-language mass media
Mass media in Assam